The Bandits of Corsica, alternative title The Return of the Corsican Brothers, is a 1953 American adventure film directed by Ray Nazarro and starring Richard Greene, Paula Raymond and Raymond Burr. It is loosely based on the 1844 novella by Alexandre Dumas, père: The Corsican Brothers.

Plot
In the eighteenth century, twin brothers overthrow a sadistic aristocrat.

Cast
 Richard Greene as Mario/Carlos 
 Paula Raymond as Christina 
 Raymond Burr as Jonatto 
 Dona Drake as Zelda 
 Raymond Greenleaf as Paoli 
 Lee Van Cleef as Nerva 
 Frank Puglia as Riggio 
 Nestor Paiva as Lorenzo 
 Peter Mamakos as Diegas 
 Paul Cavanagh as Dianza 
 Peter Brocco as Angelo 
 George J. Lewis as Arturo 
 Clayton Moore as Ricardo 
 Virginia Brissac as Maria 
 Francis McDonald as Grisha 
 Michael Ansara as Blacksmith 
 William Forrest as Marquis 
 John Pickard as Coachman

Production
Filming started September 1952.

References

External links

1953 films
1950s historical adventure films
American historical adventure films
1950s English-language films
Films based on The Corsican Brothers
Films set in Corsica
Films set in the 18th century
Films produced by Edward Small
American black-and-white films
United Artists films
Films directed by Ray Nazarro
1950s American films
Films with screenplays by Richard Schayer